Kevin R. Gowdy (born November 16, 1997) is an American professional baseball pitcher in the Los Angeles Dodgers organization. He attended Santa Barbara High School in Santa Barbara, California and was considered a top prospect for the 2016 MLB draft. Gowdy was selected by the Philadelphia Phillies in the second round, with the 42nd overall pick.

Amateur career
Gowdy made Santa Barbara High School's varsity team as a sophomore. That year, he had a 0–2 win-loss record and 1.27 earned run average (ERA) in 23 innings pitched. As a junior, he improved to 3–0 with a 0.27 ERA in 26 innings pitched, signing a National Letter of Intent to UCLA after leading his team to the CIF-SS Division II playoffs for the second straight year. He also won a gold medal with the United States at the 2015 WBSC U-18 Baseball World Cup in Japan. He earned a win against Mexico, and pitched two scoreless innings to lead Team USA to a comeback win over Cuba in the semifinal.

After his junior year, Gowdy was selected by the Philadelphia Phillies in the second round of the 2016 MLB draft. He bypassed a college career and signed with the Phillies for $3.5 million.

Professional career

Philadelphia Phillies
Gowdy was assigned to the GCL Phillies, where he spent the remainder of the season, posting a 4.00 ERA in nine innings pitched. He did not report to a minor league club to begin the 2017 season and instead underwent Tommy John surgery in August, which caused him to miss the 2018 season. He returned to pitch in 2019 with the Lakewood BlueClaws, going 0–6 with a 4.68 ERA in 24 games (16 starts), striking out 53 batters over 77 innings. He did not play in 2020 due to the cancellation of the Minor League Baseball season because of the COVID-19 pandemic. Gowdy opened the 2021 season with the Jersey Shore BlueClaws of the High-A East, going 4–5 with a 4.42 ERA and 63 strikeouts over 61 innings.

Texas Rangers
On July 30, 2021, Gowdy, Spencer Howard, and Josh Gessner were traded to the Texas Rangers in exchange for Hans Crouse, Kyle Gibson, and Ian Kennedy. He finished out the 2021 season with the Hickory Crawdads of the High-A East, going 2–1 with a 3.71 ERA and 26 strikeouts over 29 innings. Gowdy opened the 2022 season back with Hickory.

Los Angeles Dodgers
Gowdy signed a minor league contract with the Los Angeles Dodgers on January 23, 2023.

Scouting report
Gowdy throws a fastball between 89–92 miles per hour (143–148 km/h), a changeup, and a breaking ball.

References

External links

1997 births
Living people
Sportspeople from Santa Barbara, California
Baseball players from California
Baseball pitchers
Minor league baseball players
Florida Complex League Phillies players
Lakewood BlueClaws players
Jersey Shore BlueClaws players
Hickory Crawdads players
Frisco RoughRiders players